Vitória Sport Clube, commonly known as Vitória de Guimarães, are a Portuguese professional football club based in Guimarães that competes in the Primeira Liga, the top-flight of football in Portugal. During the 2016-17 campaign they competed in the Primeira Liga, Taca de Portugal and the Taca da Liga.

Competitions

Primeira Liga

Results summary

Results by matchday

Matches

Taca de Portugal

References

External links
 
 Guimaraes info at zerozero.pt

2016-17
Portuguese football clubs 2016–17 season